Telmatobius sibiricus is a species of frogs in the family Telmatobiidae.

It is endemic to Bolivia.
Its natural habitats are subtropical or tropical moist montane forest, rivers, rural gardens, heavily degraded former forest, and canals and ditches.
It is threatened by habitat loss.

References 

Sibiricus
Endemic fauna of Bolivia
Amphibians of Bolivia
Amphibians of the Andes
Frogs of South America
Amphibians described in 2003
Taxonomy articles created by Polbot